The 1919–20 season was Manchester City F.C.'s twenty-ninth season of league football, and first season back in the Football League and the FA Cup after the cancellation of competitive league football during World War I.

For this season, the Football League also made the decision to expand the size of their leagues to 22 teams apiece, giving Manchester City their first taste of a 42-match league season.

Team Kit

Football League First Division

Results summary

Reports

FA Cup

Squad statistics

Squad
Appearances for competitive matches only

Scorers

All

League

FA Cup

See also
Manchester City F.C. seasons

References

External links
Extensive Manchester City statistics site

Manchester City F.C. seasons
Manchester City F.C.